Grayville is a city in Edwards and White counties in the U.S. state of Illinois. As of the 2020 census, the city's population was 1,550, down from 1,666 at the 2010 census. Grayville is the birthplace of naval hero James Meredith Helm.

History
Grayville was founded in about 1810 by the head of the Gray family, James Gray. The city became popular for its oil. Many people came to drill for oil. In the 1950s the population began to drop. Unlike other Illinois oil towns like Crossville, Illinois Grayville is still relevant to its Two Counties

Geography
Grayville is located at  (38.259146, -87.996678).

Roads
In Grayville, Illinois Route 130 meets Illinois Route 1, and Route 1 meets Interstate 64.

Grayville was built on the Wabash River. While it is no longer on any major rail line, it was home to a large rail bridge across the Wabash into Indiana, but sections of that bridge collapsed in January 2005 due to a major flood of the Wabash River.

In late 2005, an ethanol plant was proposed for the Grayville area, and the construction of the plant would have included rebuilding the bridge and rail lines leading to it on both the Indiana and Illinois sides of the river, but as of July 2009, neither the plant nor the bridge have been built.

The largest bridge to Indiana south of Lawrenceville, and the only Interstate link between Illinois and Indiana south of Terre Haute, the I-64 river crossing runs parallel to the collapsed rail bridge, about 1000 feet upstream.

Demographics
As of the 2020 census there were 1,550 people, 680 households, and 400 families residing in the city. The racial makeup of the city was 94.45% White, 0.32% African American, 0.06% Native American, 0.71% Asian, 0.13% Pacific Islander, 0.52% from other races, and 3.81% from two or more races. Hispanic or Latino of any race were 1.61% of the population.

There were 680 households, out of which 44.41% had children under the age of 18 living with them, 43.24% were married couples living together, 14.12% had a female householder with no husband present, and 41.18% were non-families. 33.97% of all households were made up of individuals, and 20.00% had someone living alone who was 65 years of age or older. The average household size was 2.78 and the average family size was 2.24.

The city's age distribution consisted of 22.4% under the age of 18, 7.0% from 18 to 24, 26.5% from 25 to 44, 24.1% from 45 to 64, and 20.1% who were 65 years of age or older. The median age was 40.5 years. For every 100 females, there were 86.0 males. For every 100 females age 18 and over, there were 81.4 males.

The median income for a household in the city was $47,222, and the median income for a family was $58,333. Males had a median income of $41,522 versus $22,500 for females. The per capita income for the city was $24,233. About 14.0% of families and 20.5% of the population were below the poverty line, including 29.5% of those under age 18 and 18.0% of those age 65 or over.

The River

Grayville had been at the northern end of a four-mile-long oxbow bend of the main channel of the Wabash River. The river changed course after a flood in 1985, with the result being that the town is now two miles from the new river channel. Bonpas Creek trickles through a portion of the former river channel, creating continued access to water for canoes, rafts, and extremely shallow-draft small boats.

References

External links

For information on Grayville's schools visit https://www.gcusd.com/

Cities in Illinois
Cities in Edwards County, Illinois
Cities in White County, Illinois